Phaggaṇ is the twelfth and last month of the Nanakshahi calendar, which governs activities within Sikhism. This month coincides with Phalguna in the Hindu calendar and the Indian National calendar, and February and March of the Gregorian and Julian calendars and is 30 or 31 days long.

Important events during this month

February
February 12 (1 Phaggaṇ) - The start of the month Phaggaṇ
February 21 (10 Phaggaṇ) - Saka Nankana Sahib
February 21 (10 Phaggaṇ) - Jaito Morcha

March
March 14 (1 Chet) - The end of the month Phaggaṇ and the start of Chet

See also
Punjabi calendar

External links
www.srigranth.org SGGS Page 133

Months of the Nanakshahi calendar
Sikh terminology